Phola is a populated place in the Emalahleni Local Municipality, Nkangala District Municipality in the Mpumalanga Province of South Africa.

As of the 2011 census, Phola had a population of 31,885 distributed across 8,913 households.

History 
On 28 February 2017, protests took place in Phola over the issue of employment. One of the key demands was for more business opportunities and skill development centres in the area, as many looking for employment had to work at cities elsewhere. The protesters constructed road barricades out of burning tyres and set fire to several vehicles, including a bus. The local law enforcement made ten arrests and charged them with public violence.

See also
 List of populated places in South Africa

References 

Populated places in the Emalahleni Local Municipality, Mpumalanga